Pont de Rungis–Aéroport d'Orly is an RER station in Thiais, in the départment of Val-de-Marne. The station is served by RER C trains, some of which terminate at the station. The station is connected to both terminals of Paris-Orly Airport by the ADP (Aéroport de Paris) shuttle bus service.

It is proposed that the Paris Métro Line 14 be extended towards the Orly Airport, and the Line 14 will have a stop at Pont de Rungis. The extension is foreseen to open around 2024.

Gallery

See also
 List of stations of the Paris RER

External links

 

Airport railway stations in France
Réseau Express Régional stations
Railway stations in Val-de-Marne